The Acrobatic Fly (also known as The Balancing Bluebottle) is a 1910 British short  silent documentary film, directed by F. Percy Smith, featuring close-ups of a housefly secured to the head of a match and juggling objects with its feet. The film, "is one of a series of Smith films on similar subjects around this time," and according to Mark Duguid of the BFI is, "near identical to, though briefer than, a sequence in his 1911 release The Strength and Agility of Insects."

References

External links

British black-and-white films
British silent short films
1910 documentary films
Black-and-white documentary films
Films about flies
British short documentary films
1910s short documentary films
1910s British films
Silent documentary films